Big Calm is the second studio album by English electronic music group Morcheeba. It was released in March 1998 by Indochina Records and Sire Records. The album reached the top 20 of the UK Albums Chart, while the single "Part of the Process" charted in the top 40 of the UK Singles Chart in August of the same year. "The Music That We Hear", included on special-edition versions of the album, is a reworking of "Moog Island" from Morcheeba's debut album, Who Can You Trust? The album cover was inspired by that of the 1966 Ray Conniff compilation Hi Fi Companion.

Recording and composition
The recording of the album started on Christmas Day 1995, as Morcheeba members Paul and Ross Godfrey were awaiting the release of Who Can You Trust?. After basic demos had been laid down at their home studio, the duo brought in vocalist Skye Edwards and a number of guest performers to complete the record. Steve Bentley-Klein provided a string-arrangement for "The Sea", while "Let Me See" features Dom Pipkin on organ and Jimmy Hastings on flute. The song "Blindfold" had been written for the film She's So Lovely, but was not deemed ready for the feature. "Friction" features Spikey T while the title track includes contributions from Jason Furlow and DJ Swamp.

Track listing
All lyrics written by Paul Godfrey, Ross Godfrey & Skye Edwards except 11 written by Paul Godfrey, Ross Godfrey, Skye Edwards & Jason Furlow

Personnel
Skye Edwards – vocals and production
Paul Godfrey – programming, scratching, live drums and lyrics
Ross Godfrey – all guitars, sitar, pedal steel, lap steel, clavinet, Hammond, Fender Rhodes, Wurlitzer piano, drums, EMS synthesizer and MKS 80
Pete Norris – sound manipulation, synthesizer programming
Spikey-T – Jamaican vocals on "Friction"
Jason Furlow aka Nosaj the Great – rapping on "Big Calm"

Charts

Weekly charts

Year-end charts

Certifications and sales

References

1998 albums
Morcheeba albums
Sire Records albums